Triton Junior–Senior High School is a public high school in Bourbon, Indiana just south of U.S. Highway 30. It is a part of the Triton School Corporation. The school's current principals are Nate McKeand and Rick Yarbrough. The Triton School Corporation, formed in 1963 to consolidate the schools of Bourbon, Etna Green, and Tippecanoe, is located in east central Marshall County, Indiana. It draws students from both east central Marshall and west central Kosciusko Counties. In 2019, the school was expanded, adding a new gym called the Triton Activities Center (TAC).

The nearby Bourbon Community Building-Gymnasium was listed on the National Register of Historic Places in 2015 and removed from the register in 2021 as it was demolished.

Demographics
The demographic breakdown of the 428 students enrolled at Triton Jr-Sr High in 2015-16 was:
Male - 48.8%
Female - 51.2%
Native American/Alaskan - 0%
Asian/Pacific islanders - 0.9%
Black - 0.2%
Hispanic - 5.4%
White - 90.4%
Multiracial - 3.1%

37.78% of the students were eligible for free or reduced cost lunch. Triton was a Title I school in 2015–2016.

Athletics

The Triton Trojans compete in the Hoosier North Athletic Conference. The school colors are royal blue and gold. The following IHSAA sanctioned sports are offered:

Baseball (boys)
State Champions - 2001
Basketball (girls & boys)
Boys State Champions - 2008
Girls State Champion - 2000, 2001
Cross Country (girls & boys)
Football (boys)
Golf (girls & boys)
Softball (girls)
Tennis (girls & boys)
Track (girls & boys)
Volleyball (girls)
Wrestling (boys)

See also
 List of high schools in Indiana

References

External links

Public high schools in Indiana
Public middle schools in Indiana
1963 establishments in Indiana